The preliminary round of the 2023 Africa Cup of Nations qualification tournament decided the six teams which advanced to the group stage of the qualification tournament. The preliminary round consisted of the twelve lowest-ranked teams among the 54 entrants, and was held from 23 to 29 March 2022.

The twelve teams were split into six ties which were played in home-and-away two-legged format. The six winners: Botswana (awarded), São Tomé and Príncipe, South Sudan, Lesotho, Eswatini and Gambia advanced to the group stage to join the 42 teams which entered directly.

Draw 
The draw for the preliminary round was held on 21 January 2022 at 16:00 WAT (UTC+1) in Douala, Cameroon. The twelve involved national teams were previously seeded into two pots of six based on the FIFA World Rankings from 23 December 2021 (shown in parentheses).

The teams in bold qualified for the qualifying group stage.

Former Cameroon captain Rigobert Song and Nigerian former player Emmanuel Amunike were the draw assistants during the ceremony. The draw resulted in six ties.

Matches 
On 2 March 2022, Eritrea withdrew from the preliminary round.

The first legs were played on 23 and 24 March, and the second legs were played on 27 and 29 March.

In May, Mauritius were awarded a 3–0 win in their first leg against São Tomé and Príncipe, allowing them to reach the group stage with a 6–3 aggregate score, after the goalscorer for the latter Luís Leal was found to have breached the COVID-19 regulations. However, in June, São Tomé and Príncipe had their appeal honoured and the result of the first leg was allowed to stand, enabling them to qualify for the next stage 4–3 on aggregate.

|}

São Tomé and Príncipe won 4–3 on aggregate.

South Sudan won 5–2 on aggregate.

Lesotho won 3–1 on aggregate.

Eswatini won 5–1 on aggregate.

Gambia won 3–2 on aggregate.

Goalscorers

References 

 
2023
Qualification
2022 in African football
2023 in African football
March 2022 sports events in Africa